Parliamentary elections were held in Cape Verde on 14 January 2001. The result was a victory for the African Party for the Independence of Cape Verde run by José Maria Neves, which won 40 of the 72 seats in the National Assembly, defeating the ruling Movement for Democracy led by Carlos Veiga.  Third was the Democratic Alliance for Change (ADM) led by José dos Santos Luís with 6.12% of the votes.

Results

References

External links
National Elections Commission 

Elections in Cape Verde
2001 in Cape Verde
Cape Verde
January 2001 events in Africa